The Myanmar Football Federation (MFF) is the governing body of football in Myanmar. The MFF oversees the Burmese men's national team, the women's national team, and youth national teams as well as national football championships and professional club competitions.

History
Reportedly introduced during the British colonial era by James George Scott, a British colonial administrator, football has been the most popular sport in the country. The Burma Football Federation was founded in 1947, a year before the country's independence from the United Kingdom. The BFF joined FIFA in 1952, and the AFC in 1954.

The federation launched the first States and Divisions Football Championship in 1952. The highly popular annual competition became the main venue from which to draw out talented players from around the country. This rudimentary level of talent development seemed sufficient for a while. Burma was a top Asian football power, along with Iran and South Korea, in the 1960s and early 1970s, winning two Asian Games tournaments (1966, 1970) and then unprecedented five South East Asian Games tournaments (1965–1973) as well as coming in second in the 1968 Asian Cup tournament. During a ten-year span between 1961 and 1970, Burma thoroughly dominated the U-19/U-20 Asian Cup, reaching the finals nine times and winning the tournament seven times.

Starting from the mid-1970s, the country's football success—a source of much national pride—also declined rapidly, along with the country's precipitous economic decline. (Aside from a few regional tournament wins, the Burmese men's national team has not won any major football competition since 1973.) The federation did (or could do) little to promote development of football, or nurture the talent through professional league competitions. Until 1996, the country's main football league consisted of Yangon-based clubs run by government ministries and known for corruption. Although private football clubs were allowed to join the Myanmar Premier League in 1996, the league still did not attract much following by Burmese public. In December 2008, the MFF announced the formation a new national professional league, Myanmar National League, which will start its first full season in 2010.

In accordance with FIFA regulations, the MFF reportedly became an independent organization, free of government control, in March 2009.

Competitions run by the MFF
 Myanmar National League
 MNL-2
 General Aung San Shield
 Myanmar Women League

Programmes 
The MFF has launched the FIFA Football for Schools project with the support of the FIFA Foundation on 31 January 2020. The event, hosted by MFF President Zaw Zaw, was attended by the State Counsellor H. E. Aung San Suu Kyi, Union Minister for the Health and Sports Dr. Myint Htwe, Union Minister for Education Dr. Myo Thein Gyi, FIFA Foundation CEO Youri Djorkaeff, together with guests, presidents and secretaries from local township football associations.

Association staff

See also

 Myanmar national football team
 Myanmar women's national football team
 Myanmar National League
 Myanmar national under-23 football team
 Myanmar Grand Royal Challenge Cup
 Myanmar women's national under-20 football team
 Myanmar Premier League
 Myanmar national under-17 football team
 Football in Burma
 Myanmar national under-20 football team
 Myanmar national futsal team
 Myanmar women's national under-17 football team
 Myanmar national beach soccer team
 Myanmar Football Academy

References

External links
 Official website
 Soccer Myanmar Website
 Myanmar National League
 Myanmar at the FIFA website.
 Myanmar at AFC site

Football in Myanmar
Myanmar
Football
Sports organizations established in 1947
1947 establishments in Burma